Tangirala Sowmya, daughter of the late Tangirala Prabhakara Rao, won by 74,827 votes in 2014 by-elections held for Nandigama constituency being TDP candidate. By-poll was necessitated following the death of her father Tangirala Prabhakara Rao due to cardiac arrest.

References

Living people
Andhra Pradesh MLAs 2014–2019
Telugu Desam Party politicians
People from Krishna district
Women members of the Andhra Pradesh Legislative Assembly
Year of birth missing (living people)
Place of birth missing (living people)
Telugu politicians
21st-century Indian women politicians